Shanxi is a town in Wencheng County, Zhejiang province, China. , it has 22 villages under its administration.
Fuqiangxin Village
Jietou Village
Jiewei Village
Tanqi Village
Xiapaitan Village
Xinjian Village
Nanyang Village
Zhuchuan Village
Xiangkeng Village
Lianxin Village
Wuxin Village
Yaping Village
Tangshan Village
Songkeng Village
Aoyang Village
Zhennan Village
Shanhu Village
Yunxi Village
Jingyuan Village
Wanli Village
Nanchuan Village
Huayang Village

See also 
 List of township-level divisions of Zhejiang

References 

Township-level divisions of Zhejiang
Wencheng County